Matt Bryans (born 1977) is an artist based in London. Bryans has exhibited at Tate Modern in the exhibition Untitled (2005), with Amie Dicke, Godfried Donkor, Dr Lakra, Wangechi Mutu, Jockum Nordström, Stephen Shearer and Nicole Wermers. He erases colour photographs from magazines, leaving behind smudged and smeared newsprint. Such collections of masked news stories covered the walls of galleries in immersive installations.

Examples of Bryans work have been acquired by several important public art collections, including the Museum of Contemporary Art, Los Angeles and Tate Modern, London.

Exhibitions

2008 Matt Bryans, Kate MacGarry, London
2007 Matt Bryans, Martin van Zomeren, Amsterdam
2006 Matt Bryans, Atlanta Center of Contemporary Art, USA
2006 Matt Bryans, Kate MacGarry, London
2005 Picture This!, MMD Museum Dhondt-Dhaenens, Deurle, Belgium
2005 Matt Bryans, Salon 94, New York
2005 Matt Bryans - Landscapes, Martin van Zomeren, Amsterdam
2003 Matt Bryans, Kate MacGarry, London

References

British installation artists
1977 births
Living people